Sparganothis bistriata is a species of moth of the family Tortricidae. It is found in the United States, including Arkansas, Florida, Georgia, Louisiana, Mississippi, North Carolina, Pennsylvania, South Carolina, Texas and Virginia.

The wingspan is about 22 mm.

References

Moths described in 1907
Sparganothis